Dillinger is a 1973 American gangster film about the life and criminal exploits of notorious bank robber John Dillinger. It stars Warren Oates as Dillinger, Ben Johnson as his pursuer, FBI Agent Melvin Purvis, and Cloris Leachman as the "Lady in Red" who made it possible for Purvis to kill Dillinger.  It also features the first film performance by the singer Michelle Phillips as Dillinger's moll Billie Frechette. The film, narrated by Purvis, chronicles the last few years of Dillinger's life (depicted as a matter of months) as the FBI and law enforcement closed in. The setting is Depression era America, from 1933 to 1934, with largely unromanticized depictions of the principal characters. It was written and directed by John Milius for Samuel Z. Arkoff's American International Pictures.

Retired FBI Agent Clarence Hurt, one of the agents involved in the final shootout with Dillinger, was the film's technical advisor. The film includes documentary imagery and film footage from the era. It includes a verbal renouncing of gangster films written by FBI chief J. Edgar Hoover: he was scheduled to read it for the film, but died before it started production. Hoover's text is read at the film's close by voice actor Paul Frees.

The film was followed by two made-for-TV spin-offs: Melvin Purvis: G-Man (1974) (teleplay written by Milius) and The Kansas City Massacre (1975), both directed by Dan Curtis and each starring Dale Robertson as Purvis.

Plot
During the Great Depression, various bank robbers and other outlaws have become folk heroes due to public distrust of financial institutions and the law. Following the Kansas City Massacre in June 1933 in which several law enforcement offers were killed brazenly in broad daylight, FBI field office chief Melvin Purvis decides to personally hunt down the men he deems responsible: Charles Arthur "Pretty Boy" Floyd, Lester "Baby Face" Nelson, George "Machine Gun" Kelly, "Handsome" Jack Klutas, Wilbur Underhill and John Dillinger. During a meeting with fellow FBI agent Samuel Cowley, Purvis makes it clear he seeks personal vengeance and that he's willing to use extralegal measures if necessary.

Dillinger is in the midst of his criminal career, accompanied by Homer Van Meter, Harry Pierpont, Charles Mackley, and others, and is very boastful about his exploits. He meets Billy Frechette at a bar and immediately takes a liking to her, but becomes nonplussed when she doesn't recognize him and robs the bar patrons to impress her. She becomes his lover, accompanying him and his gang on their exploits. During one robbery in East Chicago, the gang loses Mackley and several others, forcing the gang to scatter.

It is during this time that Purvis has begun his purge of the gangsters, hunting down and killing Underhill and Klutas and capturing Kelly. He's unable to move against Dillinger and the others as they have not violated federal laws yet. While lying low in Arizona with the rest of the gang, Dillinger is captured by the local authorities and transported to Crown Point, Indiana. While imprisoned there, Dillinger makes a daring escape after carving a bar of soap into the shape of a gun and fooling the guards into releasing him. It is during this escape that Dillinger finally commits a federal crime, driving a stolen car across state lines.

He takes a fellow prisoner Reed Youngblood with him, and they eventually meet back up with the gang, including new members Nelson and Floyd. They start a crime spree across the Midwest to the chagrin of Purvis, angry and jealous of  how the media romanticizes their exploits. The gang's luck runs out following a bank robbery in Mason City, Iowa, which leads to a violent shootout ending in Youngblood's death and the wounding of another member. While staying at the Little Bohemia lodge in Wisconsin following the heist, Purvis leads a team of FBI agents on a raid of the lodge, costing numerous agents' lives and sending the gang scattering again. During this chaos, Pierpont, Nelson, Van Meter, and Floyd are all hunted down by either federal agents or local vigilantes and summarily killed.

While hiding in Chicago, Dillinger makes the acquaintance of a brothel owner, Anna Sage. Purvis, sensing an opportunity, offers to protect Sage from being deported if she'll help finger Dillinger. While attending the gangster film Manhattan Melodrama at the Biograph Theater, Purvis and his men get into position to capture Dillinger as he, Sage, and a female acquaintance exit the theater. At the last minute, Purvis instead goads Dillinger into going for his gun and then shoots the gangster down in the alleyway.

In the epilogue, it is revealed that Sage was eventually deported back to Romania despite Purvis' promise, Purvis eventually committed suicide after retiring from the FBI, Frechette ended up dying penniless, and Dillinger's likeness is now used for the FBI's targets during shooting practice.

J. Edgar Hoover's postscript, voiced by Paul Frees
Dillinger was in production in early 1972, more than a year before its Dallas premiere on June 19, 1973. J. Edgar Hoover, who died on May 2, 1972, wrote a denunciation of the film's glamorization of gangsters. Hoover's message is delivered by voice actor Paul Frees after the end credits have stopped rolling:

"Dillinger was a rat that the country may consider itself fortunate to be rid of, and I don't sanction any Hollywood glamorization of these vermin. This type of romantic mendacity can only lead young people further astray than they are already, and I want no part of it."

Cast
Warren Oates as John Dillinger
Ben Johnson as Melvin Purvis
Michelle Phillips as Billie Frechette
Cloris Leachman as Anna Sage
Harry Dean Stanton as Homer Van Meter
Geoffrey Lewis as Harry Pierpont
John Ryan as Charles Mackley
Richard Dreyfuss as Baby Face Nelson
Steve Kanaly as Pretty Boy Floyd
John Martino as Eddie Martin
Roy Jenson as Samuel Cowley
Read Morgan as Big Jim Wollard
Frank McRae as Reed Youngblood

Period music
As photographs of Depression-era's impoverished victims pass on the screen during opening credits, "We're in the Money" (from Golddiggers of 1933) is heard on the soundtrack. 
The 1917 tango, "La Cumparsita", still popular in the 1930s, plays during a scene in a Chicago restaurant, followed by "Beyond the Blue Horizon" from the 1930 film Monte Carlo.
"One More Chance", popularized by Bing Crosby in his 1931 short film of the same name, plays during a scene featuring Machine Gun Kelly. 
Another song popularized by Crosby, "It's Easy to Remember (And So Hard to Forget)", was written for his film Mississippi, released in 1935, one year after Dillinger's death. It is heard during an intimate bedroom scene with Dillinger and Billie Frechette.
The 1929 song, Happy Days Are Here Again, featured in the Technicolor finale of the 1930 film, Chasing Rainbows, is prominently featured in the aftermath of Dillinger's capture. 
The melody "Honey", a 1929 hit for Rudy Vallée, is heard through the entire length of the closing credits.

Production

Development
In the early 1970s, John Milius was one of the most sought-after screenwriters in Hollywood, selling his scripts for Jeremiah Johnson and The Life and Times of Judge Roy Bean for record sums. He was unhappy with the way both films turned out, however, and wanted to turn director. He approached Samuel Z. Arkoff of AIP with the offer of writing a script "for a fraction of his usual price" if he could direct.

Milius says AIP gave him three choices – Blacula, Black Mama, White Mama or "a gangster thing with Pretty Boy Floyd or Dillinger. I looked at the gangsters of the early thirties and the one that had the most appeal was Dillinger. It was a subject I never would have chosen myself but it allowed me to show how good I could do a gunfight. It was a showcase to show everyone I could make it cut together, make the story hold and make the actors act."

The project was announced in April 1972.

"My father always predicted I would wind up in San Quentin by the age of 21", said Milius. "I wouldn't want to disappoint him too much. So here I am... directing a film about John Dillinger, the greatest criminal that ever lived."
 
Milius cast Warren Oates in the lead. Milius had wanted Oates to play the lead role in The Life and Times of Judge Roy Bean. "I write all my things for Warren Oates or young John Wayne types", he said. "Or sometimes Clint Eastwood. He looks good holding a gun. But to me, John Wayne is the ultimate American hero. Not because he's big and tough but because he's sentimental. My pictures are sentimental and idealistic. I deal with values of friendliness and courtliness and the family and chivalry and honor and courage – not just guts but bigger than life courage. Nobody today writes movies in the style that I do. Nobody. I write characters that are strong and direct, super individuals. The people in my movies fear no one but God."

Milius says he wanted to make a movie about Dillinger because "of all the outlaws, he was the most marvelous". He elaborated:
People admired and respected Dillinger for being the greatest criminal. They admired him because he could get away with it. Because he did it well and he did it with style. And also because he enjoyed his work. I've made a myth out of him but not a romantic myth like Bonnie and Clyde. Dillinger is a tough guy he's a Cagney. I'm not at all concerned with showing his early life or explaining how he got that way. What I'm interested in is the legend. That's what this movie is, that's exactly what it is. It's not a character study or a Freudian analysis; it's an American folk tale
Michelle Phillips claimed she got cast by pretending to be half Cherokee, like her character.

Shooting
Filming took place in late 1972. Dillinger was filmed in its entirety in Oklahoma.

Much use of various local landmark buildings was used in the filming from Jet, Nash, Jefferson, and Enid in northern Oklahoma, to Ardmore, Dougherty, the Chickasaw Lake Club which served as Dillinger's "Little Bohemia" Wisconsin hideout, and the old iron truss bridge near Mannsville in the south. Oklahoma City locals included the Skirvin Tower ballroom and the Midwest Theater downtown, filling in as the Biograph. The house at the end of the movie was filmed in Dougherty.

"It's my first time as director and I think I did an excellent job because I had such a superb script", said Milius.

Reception
Roger Ebert of the Chicago Sun-Times awarded three stars out of four and called it "the film, we may speculate, that John Milius was born to make: violent, tough, filled with guns and blood." He added, "Dillinger is played by Warren Oates, a gifted actor with an uncanny physical resemblance to the gangster. Oates is lean in speech and lanky in appearance, and toward the end of the film, he does a good job of getting jumpy." A. H. Weiler of The New York Times wrote, "'Dillinger' does capture the look of the nineteen-thirties, but its violence dominates the scene and the players, who remain largely undefined figures on a bloody landscape." Gene Siskel of the Chicago Tribune gave the film two-and-a-half stars out of four and wrote that it "repeatedly copies the spirit, and a few scenes, of 'Bonnie and Clyde.' But it is distinguished by its acting. Director John Milius has cast fine second-tier actors who lend the familiar story great style." Variety wrote, "Necessarily episodic, it loses somewhat in a lack of straight storyline, but there's sufficient fast action of the gangster type to satisfy this particular market." Kevin Thomas of the Los Angeles Times wrote, "The idea that the Depression could create folk heroes out of gangsters was expressed with such freshness and imagination in 'Bonnie and Clyde' that it seemed like a revelation. In 'Dillinger' (at selected theaters) writer John Milius, in his feature directorial debut, attempts to make the same point, but because it has already been made so powerfully it comes out like mere repetition." Gary Arnold of The Washington Post was negative, writing that "Milius doesn't have anything fresh to offer the period or the characters. As usual, he just feeds off certain influential movies, idolizes a strongman with a gun, and alternates predictable notes of facetiousness, viciousness, and 'poignance.'"

Milius later said in 2003:
I look at it today and I find it very crude, but I do find it immensely ambitious. We didn't have a lot of money or time, and we didn't have such things – we only had so many feet of track, stuff like that. So I couldn't do moving shots if they involved more than, what, six yards of track. We never had any kind of crane or anything. That's the way movies were made then.

By 1976, Variety estimated the film had earned $4 million in rentals. It holds a score of 93% on Rotten Tomatoes based on 14 reviews.

Evaluation in film guides
Steven H. Scheuer's Movies on TV (1986–87 edition) assigns Dillinger 2½ stars (out of 4), opining that "Warren Oates gives a fine performance as Dillinger, but the script leaves no room for insight into the character and thus makes him merely a cartoon book villain". Scheuer ends with, "[W]ritten and directed by John Milius, then 29 years old. Impressive debut in some ways." Leonard Maltin's TV Movies & Video Guide (1989 edition) gives a slightly higher 3 stars (out of 4), describing it as a "[H]eavily romanticized gangster movie" that "is aided by some of the roughest, most violent gun battle ever staged on screen. The last sentence indicates that the "[S]tory follows Dillinger midway through his bank-robbing career up until his death outside the Biograph Theatre." By the 2014 edition, Maltin revised the earlier sentence to indicate, "is aided by some rough, violent gun battles."

Mick Martin's & Marsha Porter's DVD & Video Guide (2007 edition) puts its rating still higher, at 4 stars (out of 5), concluding that "John Milius made an explosive directorial debut with this rip-roaring gangster film featuring Warren Oates in his best starring role. As a jaunty John Dillinger, he has all the charisma of a Cagney or a Bogart."

Among British references there was not much enthusiasm for the film, with David Shipman in his 1984 The Good Film and Video Guide giving 1 (out of 4) stars, specifying that Baby Face Nelson is portrayed by "Richard Dreyfuss acting away like mad". Shipman further notes that "[T]here are a great many gun battles and since this is an exploitation movie there is much twitching and shuddering till the bodies lie still. There is also much borrowed from Bonnie and Clyde."

Fictionalization
Theodore "Handsome Jack" Klutas is shown being killed by Melvin Purvis; in fact, Klutas of the College Kidnappers was killed by Chicago Police on January 6, 1934.
Wilbur Underhill is shown being shot and killed by Melvin Purvis; in fact, Underhill died on January 6, 1934, of wounds inflicted more than a week previously by an inter-jurisdictional group of law officers led by FBI Agents T.H. Colvin and Frank Smith, a survivor of the Kansas City Massacre.  Purvis had nothing to do with the apprehension.
In this film and a related John Milius film Melvin Purvis: G-Man, George "Machine Gun" Kelly is shown being hunted down and captured by Purvis on September 26, 1933; in fact, Kelly was captured by the Memphis, Tennessee Police and the Birmingham, Alabama Office of the FBI. (Also Kelly's alleged quote "Don't Shoot, G-Men" is a myth.) Ironically the film's newsreel footage of Dillinger being transported from Arizona is that of Kelly being extradited. 
In the film, a Chicago bank guard named O'Malley is killed by the Dillinger gang during a robbery attempt. William Patrick O'Malley was a member of the East Chicago Police force killed on January 15, 1934. Likewise, Dillinger gang member Eddie Green is shown being killed in the getaway; in fact, Green was killed in March 1934.
Dillinger gang member Herbert Youngblood is shown being killed during a bank robbery by the Dillinger gang in Iowa. In reality, Youngblood had been killed alone in a gunfight with police in March 1934.
The Little Bohemia Lodge shootout was filmed at the Chickasaw Country Club near Ardmore, Oklahoma. The film implies that about four of the Dillinger gang are killed and half a score of federal agents were casualties. The first three men shot in the raid were two Civilian Conservation Corps workers and a resident shot by the FBI by mistake (one killed and two wounded), while one FBI agent was killed, one FBI agent was wounded, and one constable was critically wounded.
Homer Van Meter is shown escaping from Little Bohemia and then being killed by vigilantes in Iowa, which was filmed in Dougherty, Oklahoma in the foothills of the Arbuckle Mountains. He was killed in St. Paul, Minnesota. Dillinger gang member Tommy Carroll was mortally wounded during a shootout with police in Waterloo, Iowa on June 7, 1934.
Charles Makley is shown dying of a wound and being buried by Dillinger; in fact, Makley was killed on September 22, 1934 while trying to escape from prison. Dillinger gang member John Hamilton did die of wounds, and his remains were later found in a grave.
Pretty Boy Floyd is shown greeting Dillinger at a picnic and then after the Little Bohemia shootout being shot by about a dozen FBI agents; in fact, there were only about four FBI agents present. Likewise, he was killed on October 22, 1934; gang member Baby Face Nelson was killed on November 27, 1934; both died after Dillinger was killed on July 22, 1934. There is also doubt that these two "Public Enemy's No 1" ever actually meet one another in real life.
The Dillinger film was inspired by the classic Bonnie and Clyde film; contrary to both films, the real Barrow gang used BARs instead of Thompson submachine guns. Likewise in real life, the Dillinger gang used Thompson submachine guns instead of BARs.

Paperback novelization
Shortly before the release of the film, following the era's customary timing, Curtis Books published a novelization of the screenplay by Edward Fenton (1917–1995) by his tie-in pseudonym, "Henry Clement." Under his name, Fenton was an award-winning author best known for his juvenile mysteries; books on Greek mythology, history, and culture; and English translations of the works of Greek children's author, Alki Zei.

DVD
Dillinger was released to DVD by MGM Home Video on August 12, 2003, as a Region 1 widescreen DVD and by Arrow Video (under license from MGM) on April 26, 2016, as a Region 1 widescreen Blu-ray & DVD combo pack.

Dillinger on Turner Classic Movies
Dillinger premiered on Turner Classic Movies January 14, 2017 as part of its three-film tribute to Warren Oates. It was preceded by 1967's In the Heat of the Night and 1960's Private Property.

Introductory comments
"Hello and welcome to TCM everybody. I'm Ben Mankiewicz. Tonight our subject is Warren Oates, a character actor uniquely skilled at conveying a degree of relaxed menace. Up next, Oates plays a gangster with whom he shared an unusually strong natural resemblance — from American International Pictures in nineteen seventy-three — Dillinger. John Dillinger robbed banks across the Midwest in the early nineteen thirties and he managed to be seen by some as something of a Robin Hood figure — his exploits were featured in newspapers and newsreels — making him as famous as a movie star, a pro athlete or a... a cable television host. Hi, I'm Ben Mankiewicz... how you doin'?...
 
In telling Dillinger's story, writer-director John Milius introduces us to Dillinger's girlfriend, played by singer-songwriter and actress Michelle Phillips, gangster Baby Face Nelson, played by a baby-faced Richard Dreyfuss and Federal agent Melvin Purvis, played by a member of John Ford's stock company, Ben Johnson. Purvis is pursuing criminals on the FBI's Most Wanted List. He lights a cigar before every showdown and he ends up lighting quite a few cigars during the movie so if you're a fan of gunfights with exploding blood packs, you have tuned in to the right place.

Writer-director John Milius is almost as much of a character as Dillinger himself. In the nineteen seventies, Milius wrote the screenplays for some notable movies, including The Life and Times of Judge Roy Bean and Apocalypse Now. According to one story, Milius demanded a rare rifle as part of his payment for script working on Dirty Harry. He also wrote the first draft, which Steven Spielberg described as brilliant, of Robert Shaw's famous  speech in Jaws. Milius was also the inspiration for John Goodman's character in The Big Lebowski. Dillinger was the first feature film he directed — he'd go on to direct The Wind and the Lion, Red Dawn and Conan the Barbarian. From 1973, also starring Harry Dean Stanton and, in a small role, Cloris Leachman, here's Warren Oates in the TCM premiere of Dillinger."

Ben Mankiewicz's closing comments
Dillinger had some similarities to other gangster films, like Bonnie and Clyde. There's also a nod to The Wild Bunch, where Warren Oates and Ben Johnson played brothers — they played adversaries in Dillinger. Former FBI agent Clarence Hunt, who was involved in the final shootout with Dillinger, was the film's technical advisor. The original plan was for FBI director J. Edgar Hoover to read the film's final message, but Hoover died before the movie's release and, instead, the words were read by actor and voice artist Paul Frees. Dillinger's writer and director John Milius was so interested in the character of Federal agent Melvin Purvis that he wrote another script about him, shot as a TV movie in nineteen seventy-four, with Dale Robertson as Purvis. Up next, this week's visit to the TCM Underground brings us to a short documentary about the counterculture movement of the nineteen-sixties, narrated by Robert Mitchum.

See also
List of American films of 1973

References

External links

Sample frames by cinematographer

1973 films
1973 directorial debut films
1970s biographical drama films
1970s crime drama films
American biographical drama films
American crime drama films
American International Pictures films
Films about John Dillinger
Cultural depictions of Baby Face Nelson
Cultural depictions of Pretty Boy Floyd
1970s English-language films
Films about bank robbery
Films about the Federal Bureau of Investigation
Films directed by John Milius
Films scored by Barry De Vorzon
Films set in Chicago
Films set in Indiana
Films with screenplays by John Milius
1973 drama films
Films produced by Buzz Feitshans
Films set in 1933
Films set in 1934
1970s American films